Anna Malova (Russian: Анна Малова) is a Russian model who was appointed as "Miss Russia" in the Miss Universe pageant 1998.

Biography 
As a child, Anna was engaged in artistic gymnastics. She finished school in Yaroslavl. After high school, Anna was admitted to the Yaroslavl Medical Institute at the Medical Faculty in psychotherapy. She trained as a doctor in Russia but has not licensed to practice in the United States.

The first major step for Malova as a model was the "Ford Supermodel of Russia 1993" contest which was held in Moscow in late November 1992. In 1993, she took part in the regional competition Miss Volga 1993 where she became 1st runner-up and was invited to the Miss Russia 1993 pageant - where she came in second. Then she won the title of Miss Baltic Sea 1994 in Finland and competed in the Miss World 1994 pageant in Sun City where she didn't place.

In 1995 she left Moscow, spent six weeks learning English in Florida, were she met Donald Trump, who at the time he was still married to his second wife, Marla Maples. In 1996, Malova moved to New York city into a condominium in Trump Tower on Fifth Avenue. That October, Trump acquired three beauty pageants from ITT Corp.: Miss Universe, Miss USA, and Miss Teen USA.

In 1998, she was appointed as "Miss Russia" to compete in the Miss Universe pageant and made it to the Top 10 of the Miss Universe 1998 pageant in Honolulu. But the very fact she had even entered the pageant was - as New York magazine noticed - an anomaly. After the pageant she became a popular socialite girl in New York, and was the face of some commercials and advertising such as Chopard and Home Shopping Network. Malova signed up with Karin Models, which had been founded by Jeffrey Epstein's friend Jean-Luc Brunel. Malova was once romantically linked to hedge-fund billionaire George Soros, as well as comedian Garry Shandling.

On 18 May 2010, Malova was accused of stealing prescription pads from doctors, and writing herself prescriptions for anti-anxiety drugs. Malova was later jailed for failing to attend a drug-treatment programme.

In 2019 a federal judge in New York released flight logs that showed she flew on board Epstein's plane nicknamed the Lolita Express, with heiress Ghislaine Maxwell and Prince Andrew, Queen Elizabeth II’s second son, from Epstein's private island in the Virgin Islands Little St. James (a.k.a. Pedophile Island) back to Florida in February 1999.

References

1970s births
Living people
Miss Russia winners
Miss Universe 1998 contestants
Russian women physicians
Miss World 1994 delegates
Russian socialites
Russian emigrants to the United States
People from Yaroslavl